A Fazenda 13, known as A Fazenda 13: Um Celeiro de Lendas (English: The Farm 13: A Barn of Legends) is the thirteenth season of the Brazilian reality television series A Fazenda, which premiered Tuesday, September 14, 2021, at  (BRT / AMT) on RecordTV, following a sneak peek episode that aired on September 13.

Overview

Development
Adriane Galisteu replaced Marcos Mion as the main host, thus becoming the show's first female host. Lidi Lisboa and Lucas Selfie replaced Victor Sarro as the show's online hosts and correspondents.

Like the previous season, the contestants moved into the Farm on Sunday, September 12, 2021, two days before the season premiere.

Contestants
The first seven celebrities were officially revealed by RecordTV on September 9. They were: Victor Pecoraro, Mussunzinho, Liziane Gutierrez, Nego do Borel, Tati Quebra-Barraco, Bil Araújo and Mileide Mihaile. On September 10, two more celebrities were announced: Dayane Mello and Valentina Francavilla. Medrado, Gui Araujo and Marina Ferrari were unveiled on September 11–13, through the show's profile on TikTok. On September 13, another two celebrities were also confirmed: MC Gui and Tiago Piquilo. Solange Gomes and Rico Melquiades were the last two celebrities announced in advance on September 14. The final four contestants (Aline Mineiro, Dynho Alves, Erasmo Viana and Erika Schneider) who completed the season's full lineup of celebrities were only confirmed during the season premiere. On September 17, Sthe Matos was chosen by the public as the 21st and final contestant of the season due to the Warehouse twist. Following Medrado's walking from the game, Lary Bottino was revealed as her replacement on September 29, 2021.

Future Appearances
After this season, in 2022, Mussunzinho appeared with his wife Karol Menezes in Power Couple Brasil 6, they finished as runner-up from the competition.

After this season, in 2022, Solange Gomes appeared in Ilha Record 2, she finished in 5th place in the competition.

The game

The Warehouse
On Day 2, four additional contestants (all TikTok influencers) entered the Warehouse where the public voted for one of them to move into the main House on Day 6.

Fire challenge
This season, three or more contestants (determined by a random draw) compete in the Fire challenge to win the Lamp power. The Lamp power entitles the holder two flames, red and yellow, which may unleash good or bad consequences on the nomination process, with the red flame power defined by the public through the show's profile on TikTok among two options.

The winner chooses a flame for himself and delegates which contestant holds the other. The Flame holder's choice is marked in bold.

Obligations

Voting history

Notes

Ratings and reception

Brazilian ratings
All numbers are in points and provided by Kantar Ibope Media.

Controversy and criticism

Sexual assault allegations
On September 25, 2021, singer Nego do Borel was accused by viewers of assaulting model Dayane Mello, who may have been too drunk to consent, after a party.

Following a strong social media outrage, the five main sponsors of A Fazenda (Ambev, TikTok, Seda, Banco Original and Aurora Alimentos) demanded Nego's ejection from the show to RecordTV. Later on that day, the ejection was confirmed by the network, after production review the footage and collected Dayane's testimony, to both viewers and contestants in the Farm.

However, RecordTV came under fire when, during the highlights episode that aired that night on primetime, the relationship between the two contestants was edited and shown in a romanticized and biased way in Nego's favor. In addition, two scenes in which he appears pulling Dayane back to bed and another where she told him to "stop" were all cut from the main show without explanation.

The network and production's handling of the situation were also slammed by viewers and the press for its sexist and overexposed portrayal, victim blaming and allegedly negligence during the act. Meanwhile, the host Adriane Galisteu, was praised for her emotional short speech about sexual consent at the end of the show.

On September 26, 2021, the Civil Police of the state of São Paulo announced that Nego do Borel will be summoned to testify on the accusations.

References

External links
 A Fazenda 13 on R7.com 

2021 Brazilian television seasons
A Fazenda